Pantetheine is the cysteamine amide analog of pantothenic acid (vitamin B5). The dimer of this compound, pantethine is more commonly known, and is considered to be the most potent form of vitamin B5. Pantetheine is an intermediate in the production of coenzyme A by the body.

References

Carboxamides
Thiols
Vitamins
Diols